Gail Nicholson   is an Australian Paralympic swimmer.  She won two gold medals   at the 1976 Toronto Games in the Women's 100 m Backstroke C and Women's 100 m Freestyle C events.

References

Swimmers at the 1976 Summer Paralympics
Female Paralympic swimmers of Australia
Paralympic gold medalists for Australia
Living people
Medalists at the 1976 Summer Paralympics
Year of birth missing (living people)
Paralympic medalists in swimming
Australian female freestyle swimmers
Australian female backstroke swimmers
20th-century Australian women